Nélson César Tavares Rodrigues da Veiga (born 9 February 1978) is a Cape Verdean former footballer. He could play as either a right back or a central defender.

Club career
Born in Lisbon, Portugal, Veiga played for several local clubs as a youth, finishing his development at G.D. Estoril-Praia and going on to spend his first four senior seasons with them, three in the second division and one in the third. In 2000 he signed for Vitória de Setúbal, contributing with 17 games and one goal in his first year as the Sadinos returned to the Primeira Liga.

After two more years with Vitória, Veiga returned to the second level and joined Associação Naval 1º de Maio, achieving another top flight promotion in 2005, the Figueira da Foz club's first ever. In the summer of 2006, after helping the team retain their league status, he left Portugal for the first time, going on to spend the following four seasons in Cyprus with AC Omonia and AEK Larnaca FC.

Veiga returned to his country of adoption for the 2010–11 campaign, signing for C.D. Aves in division two.

International career
Veiga chose to represent Cape Verde internationally, making his debut in 2003. He played every match in the 2006 FIFA World Cup qualification stage, only missing the fixtures against Burkina Faso and Uganda.

Personal life
Veiga is the father of the Portuguese footballer Renato Veiga.

References

External links

 

1978 births
Living people
Portuguese sportspeople of Cape Verdean descent
Citizens of Cape Verde through descent
Footballers from Lisbon
Cape Verdean footballers
Association football defenders
Primeira Liga players
Liga Portugal 2 players
Segunda Divisão players
G.D. Estoril Praia players
Vitória F.C. players
Associação Naval 1º de Maio players
C.D. Aves players
Atlético Clube de Portugal players
Cypriot First Division players
Cypriot Second Division players
AC Omonia players
AEK Larnaca FC players
Botola players
Kawkab Marrakech players
Cape Verde international footballers
Cape Verdean expatriate footballers
Expatriate footballers in Cyprus
Expatriate footballers in Morocco
Portuguese expatriates in Cyprus